Grythyttan is a locality situated in Hällefors Municipality, Örebro County, Sweden with 891 inhabitants in 2010. It is located between two lakes, Torrvarpen and Sör-Älgen. It is chiefly known in Sweden for the Grythyttan Gästgivargård (restaurant), made famous by its proprietor Carl Jan Granqvist in the late 1970s, and patronised by the pop group ABBA in the 1980s. Other local institutions include the chef and restaurant management school Grythyttan School of Hospitality, Culinary Arts & Meal Science, part of Örebro University, the Cookbook museum, Grythyttan Stålmöbler (garden furniture) and Neerings ice cream and chocolate factory and kiosk.
In the center you can also find the Cornelis Vreeswijk museum and pub.

Riksdag elections

References 

Populated places in Örebro County
Populated places in Hällefors Municipality